Karfeleh-ye Imanabad (also Romanized as Kerfeleh-ye Īmānābād; also known as Karfaleh and Kerfeleh, and Karfaleh-ye Do) is a village in Shurab Rural District, Veysian District, Dowreh County, Lorestan Province, Iran. At the 2006 census, its population was 32, in 9 families.

References 

Towns and villages in Dowreh County